St Matthew's Church, also known as the Glass Church, is an Anglican church in Millbrook, in the parish of Saint Lawrence, Jersey, in the Channel Islands. Built in 1840, the church is known for its glass-work by René Lalique added later.

History

St Matthew's was built in 1840 as a chapel of ease. In 1934, Florence Boot, Lady Trent, the widow of Jesse Boot of Boots the Chemists, commissioned an extensive renovation of the church by architect  A. B. Grayson and French glass designer René Lalique. According to BBC News, the church is noted as "the only remaining and complete example of ... Lalique's heavy, clouded glass."

Assessment and administration
On 26 September 2008, St Matthew's was listed as a Site of Special Interest by Jersey Heritage for its architectural, historical and artistic special interest. In 2010 the church received £125,000 worth of funding for restoration.

St Matthew's is an active Church of England church in the Diocese of Salisbury  (formerly under the Diocese of Winchester, but was transferred to Salisbury following a dispute with the unpopular Tim Dakin) which is part of the Province of Canterbury. The church is part of  the Deanery of Jersey. , the church's vicar is the Reverend Philip James Warren.

See also
Religion in Jersey

References

Further reading

External links

Churches in Jersey
Diocese of Winchester
Evangelicalism in the Church of England
Churches completed in 1840
Buildings and structures in Saint Lawrence, Jersey